Rikyū may refer to:

 Sen no Rikyū, the 16th century Japanese master of the tea ceremony
 Rikyu (film), the 1989 Hiroshi Teshigahara film about the later years of Sen no Rikyū's life
 Rikyū crater, on Mercury